G 1/12 is a decision issued on 30 April 2014 by the Enlarged Board of Appeal of the European Patent Office (EPO), holding that an appellant's identity in a notice of appeal can be corrected under , provided the requirements of  are met. The Enlarged Board of Appeal also held that an appellant's identity can be corrected under , first sentence, under the conditions established by the case law of the Boards of Appeal.

Background
The European Patent Convention (EPC), the multilateral treaty instituting the legal system according to which European patents are granted, contains provisions allowing a party to appeal a decision issued by a first instance department of the EPO. The appeal procedure before the EPO is a judicial procedure proper to an administrative court, and the EPO Boards of Appeal have been recognised as courts, or tribunals, of an international organisation, the EPO. 

When an appeal is lodged, the notice of appeal has to contain specific information including "the name and the address of the appellant", "an indication of the decision impugned", and "a request defining the subject of the appeal". The question has arisen as to whether the name of the appellant could be corrected after filing the notice of appeal, and questions have been referred to the Enlarged Board of Appeal under  in that regard.

Questions referred to the Enlarged Board of Appeal
The referral to the Enlarged Board of Appeal lies from an interlocutory decision T 445/08 from Technical Board of Appeal 3.3.07. The referred questions were:

Answers to the referred questions
The Enlarged Board of Appeal answered these questions as follows:

This means that the flexible approach adopted in earlier decision T 97/98 has been confirmed. Namely, the name of the appellant may be corrected to substitute another natural or legal person for the person indicated in the notice of appeal if the real intention was to file the appeal in the name of that person.

Practical aspects  
As to answer (3), point 37 of the reasons for the decision G 1/12 provides practical guidance on how to correct an Appellant's identity under , first sentence. The correction must at least satisfy the following requirements:

(a) The correction must introduce what was originally intended.

(b) Where the original intention is not immediately apparent, the requester bears the burden of proof, which must be a heavy one.

(c) The error to be remedied may be an incorrect statement or an omission.

(d) The request for correction must be filed without delay.

As to requirement (d), a decision T180/14 of April 2019 deals with a delay of four and a half years, "after the appellant had been made aware of the error for the second time". That delay did not satisfy the "without delay" requirement.

Applicability in opposition proceedings 
The principles laid out in G 1/12 can also be used in opposition proceedings to correct the designation of the opponent in the notice of opposition.

References

Further reading 
 : "Correction of errors in the description, claims and drawings - "
 : "Request for correction to be filed without delay"
 : "Law of evidence – Introduction"
 : "Principle of free evaluation of evidence"
 : "Probative value of evidence on a case-by-case basis"
 : "Payment of opposition fee - correction of a payment form"
 : "Identity of opponent and correction of opponent's name - principles"
 : "Formal aspects under  - appeal filed by wrong company"
 : "Formal aspects under  - party consisting of plurality of persons"
 : "Form and content of notice of appeal - "
 : "Payment of appeal fee - reduced fee for appeal filed by a natural person or an entity"
 : "Referral by a board of appeal – general"
 : "Referral by a board of appeal – pending proceedings"
 : "Referral by a board of appeal – ensuring uniform application of the law"
 : "Referral by a board of appeal – point of law of fundamental importance"

External links 
 G 0001/12 of 30 April 2014
 Decision G 1/12, Official Journal EPO 11/2014, A114
Decision T 445/08 of 30 January 2012 (referring decision)

G 2012 1
2014 in case law
2014 in Europe
Jurisdiction